Green children of Woolpit is a folkloric story from England.

Green child or green children may also refer to: 
 The Green Child, a novel by Herbert Read, based upon the English story
 The Green Children, a European musical duo